John Frederick Potts (February 6, 1887 – September 5, 1962) was a Major League Baseball right fielder who played for the Kansas City Packers of the Federal League in .

External links

1887 births
1962 deaths
Major League Baseball right fielders
Case Western Spartans baseball players
Kansas City Packers players
Baseball players from Ohio
Dallas Giants players
Chillicothe Infants players
Portsmouth Cobblers players
Cleveland Green Sox players
People from Tipp City, Ohio